Alfredo il grande (Alfred the Great) is a melodramma serio or serious opera in two acts by Gaetano Donizetti. Andrea Leone Tottola wrote the Italian libretto, which may have been derived from Johann Simon Mayr's 1818 opera of the same name. The opera tells the story of the Anglo-Saxon king Alfred the Great.

This opera, with its "highly Rossini-influenced score" was Donizetti's first exploration into British history, but it turned out to be a spectacular failure. It received its premiere on 2 July 1823 at the Teatro San Carlo in Naples, and this also became its last performance.

Roles

Synopsis
Time: The ninth century
Place: Isle of Athelny in Somerset

Recordings
Opera Rara, 2004. The Young Donizetti disc contains the cavatina Non é di morte il fulmine sung by Bruce Ford. London Philharmonia Orchestra, conductor: David Parry. ORR 229.
Opera Rara, 1998.  Della Jones Sings Donizetti contains Che potrei dirti, o caro? sung by Della Jones, with Theresa Goble, Ian Platt, Linda Kitchen, Brendan McBride, and David Ashman. Royal Philharmonic Orchestra, conductors Paul McGrath and David Parry.  ORR 203.

References
Notes

Cited sources
Osborne, Charles, (1994),  The Bel Canto Operas of Rossini, Donizetti, and Bellini,  Portland, Oregon: Amadeus Press. 

Other sources
Allitt, John Stewart (1991), Donizetti: in the light of Romanticism and the teaching of Johann Simon Mayr, Shaftesbury: Element Books, Ltd (UK); Rockport, MA: Element, Inc.(USA)
Ashbrook, William (1982), Donizetti and His Operas, Cambridge University Press.  
Ashbrook, William (1998), "Donizetti, Gaetano" in Stanley Sadie  (Ed.),  The New Grove Dictionary of Opera, Vol. One. London: Macmillan Publishers, Inc.   
Ashbrook, William and Sarah Hibberd (2001), in  Holden, Amanda (Ed.), The New Penguin Opera Guide, New York: Penguin Putnam. .  pp. 224 – 247.
Black, John (1982), Donizetti’s Operas in Naples, 1822—1848. London: The Donizetti Society.
Loewenberg, Alfred (1970). Annals of Opera, 1597-1940, 2nd edition.  Rowman and Littlefield
Sadie, Stanley, (Ed.); John Tyrell (Exec. Ed.) (2004), The New Grove Dictionary of Music and Musicians.  2nd edition. London: Macmillan.    (hardcover).   (eBook).
 Weinstock, Herbert (1963), Donizetti and the World of Opera in Italy, Paris, and Vienna in the First Half of the Nineteenth Century, New York: Pantheon Books.

External links
  Donizetti Society (London) website
 Libretto Italian

Operas by Gaetano Donizetti
Italian-language operas
1823 operas
Operas
Operas set in England
Opera world premieres at the Teatro San Carlo
Cultural depictions of Alfred the Great
Libretti by Andrea Leone Tottola